is a Japanese former football player and manager. He is the current assistant coach Japan national team.

Club career
Saito was born in Shizuoka on April 20, 1973. After graduating from Waseda University, he joined his local club Shimizu S-Pulse in 1996. He played as regular player from first season. At 1996 J.League Cup, the club won the champions and he was selected New Hero awards. End of 1996 season, he was also selected J.League Rookie of the Year awards. The club also won the 2nd place at 1998 Emperor's Cup and 1999 J1 League, he was also selected Best Eleven in 1999. In 2000s, the club won 1999–2000 Asian Cup Winners' Cup and 2001 Emperor's Cup. In 2006, he moved to J2 League club Shonan Bellmare and played in two seasons. In 2009, he was appointed playing manager of Prefectural Leagues side Fujieda MYFC. After promotion to the Japan Football League in 2011 and acceptance into J3 League for the 2014 season, Saito decided to leave the club.

International career
Saito was capped 17 times for the Japan national team between 1996 and 1999. His first international appearance came on August 25, 1996, in a friendly against Uruguay at Osaka Nagai Stadium. He was an unused substitute at the 1998 FIFA World Cup. He also played at 1999 Copa América.

Career statistics

Club

International

Honors
Individual
 J.League Rookie of the Year: 1996
 J.League Best XI: 1999

References

External links

Japan National Football Team Database

1973 births
Living people
Waseda University alumni
Association football people from Shizuoka Prefecture
Japanese footballers
J1 League players
J2 League players
Shimizu S-Pulse players
Shonan Bellmare players
Fujieda MYFC players
Japan international footballers
1996 AFC Asian Cup players
1998 FIFA World Cup players
1999 Copa América players
Japanese football managers
Fujieda MYFC managers
Association football defenders